Li Man-King (16 February 1922 – 5 May 2021) known by his nickname of Li Ngaw (李我) or Lee Ngo was the pioneer of airwave novel radio broadcasting in Hong Kong.

Father: li,dit sai( 李秩西）， also called li, kwong( 李光）
Mother: yip,oei wan( 葉靄雲）， who was a Chinese doctor

Career
according to the book: li ngaw told stories (book one) (chinese characters: 李我講古（一）), mr li man king( also called li ngaw) ancestral hometown is xin hui county, Guangdong province. 
He originally started broadcasting in Guangzhou, China. His fame preceded him to Hong Kong, where he performed story telling in Rediffusion Radio in 1949. In 1951 he worked for Macau's Radio Vilaverde Lda for a period of time.  In 1957 he returned to Hong Kong to work for Commercial Radio until he retired in 1975. Many of his broadcasts were available at 12 noon to unemployed, the retired and housewives in the 1950s, when he worked for Radio Rediffusion. His novels were also adapted for Hong Kong cinema.

Personal life
 He was married to Siu Sheung.

Death 
On 5 May 2021, Lau Tin Chi announced on Facebook that Li had died, aged 99.

See also
 Uncle Ray

References

1922 births
2021 deaths
Hong Kong radio presenters
Chinese emigrants to British Hong Kong